The 2016 Fox Sports Cup was a summer football friendly tournament organized by the Dutch Eredivisie and Match IQ. It was hosted by Vitesse at the GelreDome in Arnhem, from 21 to 23 July 2016. The three other European teams that took part were: Porto (Portugal), PSV Eindhoven (Netherlands), and West Bromwich Albion (England). It was sponsored by Fox Sports Netherlands.

Overview

Participants

Standings
Three points were awarded for a win, one for a draw and none for a loss. An additional point was awarded for every goal scored.

Matches

Goalscorers

Media coverage

References

External links 

2016–17 in Dutch football
2016–17 in English football
2016–17 in Portuguese football